The 1998 London Broncos season was the nineteenth in the club's history and their third season in the Super League. Coached by Tony Currie, the Broncos competed in Super League III and finished in 7th place. The club also reached the semi-final of the Challenge Cup.

1998 squad statistics

Sources: Gains & Losses

Super League table III

Source:

1998 Challenge Cup
The London Broncos progressed to the semi finals of the Cup, before losing to the Wigan Warriors by 38–8 in a one-sided game at the Alfred McAlpine Stadium, Huddersfield.

References

External links
London Broncos - Rugby League Project

London Broncos seasons
London Broncos